Sinister Swing is the third studio album by South African recording artist Ashton Nyte, frontman for the Gothic rock band The Awakening.  Described as "organic electronic / experimental" music, the album received critical acclaim for the hybrid of pre-80's electro and the "icy echoes of isolation...and just a hint of swing." Includes South African radio hits "Distance," "Fingertips" and "Real."  The album was also later performed with the University of Pretoria's theatre department as a cabaret piece.

Track listing

 "Revival"
 "Passing Phase"
 "Little Everything"
 "White White Noise"
 "Fingertips"
 "Distance"
 "Trivial Things"
 "The Cutting Room"
 "Real"
 "Borrow The Hatchet"
 "Rogue"
 "Fading"

References

2003 albums